Charles Rowland Peaslee Farnsley (March 28, 1907 – June 19, 1990), a Democrat, served as mayor of Louisville, Kentucky and as a member of the United States House of Representatives.

Life
Farnsley was born in Louisville and attended Male High School there.  He received undergraduate and law degrees from the University of Louisville and practiced law in Louisville beginning in 1930.  Farnsley served in the Kentucky House of Representatives from 1936 to 1940 and as mayor of Louisville from 1948 to 1953.  Farnsley was a very popular mayor, known for his accessibility and attention to problems large and small.

In 1964 Farnsley won Kentucky's Third District congressional seat, defeating the Republican incumbent, Marion M. "Gene" Snyder, who later was elected to the House from an adjoining district.  Farnsley served in the house from January 3, 1965 through January 3, 1967.  He did not seek re-election to the House. Farnsley voted in favor of the Voting Rights Act of 1965.

He was a member of the Society of Colonial Wars and the Sons of Confederate Veterans.

Charles Farnsley died on June 19, 1990 from Alzheimer's disease. He is buried in Cave Hill Cemetery.

See also

Rebel Yell (whiskey)

References

External links

1907 births
1990 deaths
Deaths from dementia in Kentucky
Deaths from Alzheimer's disease
Mayors of Louisville, Kentucky
Burials at Cave Hill Cemetery
Democratic Party members of the United States House of Representatives from Kentucky
Democratic Party members of the Kentucky House of Representatives
20th-century American politicians